Aulonochares is a Neotropical genus of water scavenger beetle in the family Hydrophilidae represented by three described species known from the Guiana Shield Region.

Taxonomy 
The genus Aulonochares was described for the first time by Girón & Short in 2019.

It belongs in the subfamily Acidocerinae and contains three described species from Brazil (Amazonas, Roraima), French Guiana, Guyana, Suriname, and Venezuela.

Description 
Medium-sized beetles (5.8–7.5 mm), smooth and shiny dorsally, orange-brown in coloration, with long maxillary palps. A complete diagnosis was presented by Girón and Short.

Habitat 
According to Girón and Short:

Species 

 Aulonochares lingulatus Girón and Short, 2019
 Aulonochares novoairensis Girón and Short, 2019
 Aulonochares tubulus Girón and Short, 2019

References 

Hydrophilidae
Insects of South America
Insects described in 2019